Al Bundy  is a fictional character and the protagonist of the American television series Married... with Children. 

Played by Ed O'Neill, Bundy is a misanthropic, working-class father of two who is portrayed as a somewhat tragicomedic figure. Although he laments his lot in life, he nevertheless stands by his family, displaying wit, self-sacrifice, and resilience in times of crisis. 

He and his wife, Peggy, were rated the 59th best characters on television by Bravo. In a 2016 interview, O'Neill said he based his interpretation of Al Bundy on one of his uncles.

Character history 

Al Bundy was born on November 7, 1948 in Chicago, Illinois. He was a star fullback  on the Polk High School Football team. However, a literal shotgun-marriage to his high-school sweetheart Peggy Wanker (Katey Sagal), which happened after Al got her pregnant and while he was drunk, and a broken leg prevented him from attending college on a football scholarship. His favorite song is "Anna (Go to Him)".  

Al and Peggy have two children: Kelly (Christina Applegate), a promiscuous, dim-witted blonde, and Bud (David Faustino), an intelligent but sex-crazed and unpopular schemer named after Budweiser beer. His next door neighbor, Marcy (Amanda Bearse), is his archnemesis, and the two frequently squabble.

Al lives in a suburb of Chicago and is the proud owner of a 1970s Dodge Demon. He works as a shoe salesman at the fictional Gary's Shoes and Accessories for Today's Woman in the fictional New Market Mall. Al hates his job, loses it several times throughout the series, yet always ends up coming back to it. There is a running joke throughout the show that Al makes minimum wage. Despite Al's hatred of his job, its only redeeming feature in his opinion is the fact it gets him out of the house and away from Peggy.  

In one episode, Al is offered early retirement and given a year's pay: $12,000, yet in another he says that after taxes and Peggy's spending he only gets one nickel out of every paycheck. In "My Mom, The Mom", Al states he earns a 10% commission on each sale. In "Weenie Tot Lovers and Other Strangers", Peg states his paycheck was for "80 pesos". The family also brought in income through game-shows, theft, various absurd schemes, and mooching off of the Rhoades/D'Arcy's wealth.

Throughout the series, Al is continually saddled with massive debts caused by everything from the various disasters he becomes involved in to his wife's extravagant spending habits. However, he never appears to miss a mortgage payment or file for bankruptcy. The "Bundy Will", passed down from generation to generation as a punishment, indebted the "benefactor" with these debts Al Bundy has incurred. In the episode "England Show I", it was stated Al's ancestor, Seamus McBundy, insulted an obese witch, and brought a curse upon the fictional Bundy ancestral town of Lower Uncton in England.

In flashbacks, it is revealed Al's mother may have been an alcoholic. While pondering his shortcomings over a toothpaste sandwich, he relives a moment where his mother tells him that he can become anything while audibly saying "Yeah right, Mom, try saying that when you're sober!" In a similar situation, he asks her if she wants her Bloody Mary. In one flashback episode, Al had an overdue library book for 30 years; he tries to get out of paying a $2,163.20 library fine by tricking the librarian (an old enemy of his) into believing he had returned it years before, only to have his trick revealed on closed-circuit Chicago television.

Most of the show's running gags concern Al. Aside from his bad luck, Al also maintains a "do-it-yourself" attitude whenever something in the house needs repair. Combined with his creativity, poor judgment, and lack of skill, this usually produces absurd results, and often resulting in property damage and/or physical injury to Al.

Al is also frequently described as being careless about hygiene: he is often told he smells bad. He is often seen leaving restrooms, even public ones, with a newspaper tucked under his arm, to the sound of a toilet flushing. A running gag is that Al showers and brushes his teeth as rarely as he has sex, which is extremely infrequent, as he continually rejects and avoids Peggy's advances.

Al is disliked by most of his neighbors, except for Steve Rhoades (David Garrison) and, after he leaves town, Jefferson D'Arcy (Ted McGinley); both are, at different times, married to Marcy. In "Route 666" Marcy said when they thought Al had died, they all started dancing and singing "Ding dong, the shoe man's dead" and called it a "cruel, cruel hoax" when they learned it was a false alarm—as usual, Al had survived his latest misadventure. In another example of the neighborhood's distaste of Al during "You Better Shop Around", after he blacked out everyone's houses during a heatwave, the neighbors attempt to attack him with pitchforks and torches. Other people pay little to no attention to him and, as a result, his name often ends up misspelled on paychecks, reserved parking spots, etc. (e.g., "Bumby", "Boondy" or "Birdy").

Despite being a somewhat phlegmatic and slow person, Bundy has a sarcastic and cynical sense of humor; he also has a definite love for his family. Examples can be seen on the rare occasions when he enjoys luxury and money. In one episode, Peggy and Al receive free first class plane tickets to New York City from Marcy. They are shown sipping champagne together and singing "I Got You, Babe".

In another episode, Al's Dodge turns up missing and the only reason he wants it back is to recover an item in the trunk. The item turns out to be a family photo of Al, Peg, Kelly, and Bud together. This suggests his distaste for them is spawned merely by his disappointment in his extremely poor quality of life.

Al dislikes obese women and cannot stop himself from insulting them to their faces with one-liners, a behavior he has engaged in since he was a child. He also hates his job, the prospect of having sex with his wife, and his feminist neighbor Marcy.

He loves nudie magazines, free beer, bowling, and "nudie" bars, and often cherishes the glory moment of his past: scoring four touchdowns in a single game while playing for the fictional Polk High School Panthers in the 1966 city championship game versus fictional Andrew Johnson High School.

Like all Bundys, Al is profoundly selfish, and is repeatedly depicted engaging, along with the rest of his family, in criminal activity in attempts to get rich such as robbing a group of tourists at gunpoint, demanding their jewelry, scamming the elderly by posing as a elderly female psychic, and attempting to write off his stolen car as worth millions of dollars.

Another episode, "Damn Bundys", featured Al selling his soul to the devil (Robert Englund) in order to lead the Chicago Bears to the Super Bowl as the oldest rookie in NFL history; Al scores the touchdown and ends up in hell with his family and neighbors for 300 years. In real life, O'Neill, a college football standout, tried out for the Pittsburgh Steelers in 1969, the first season of Hall of Famers Chuck Noll and "Mean Joe" Greene, but was cut in training camp, leading to O'Neill re-enrolling at Youngstown State University and starting his acting career there.

In the Season 10 episode "Dud Bowl II", a scoreboard at Polk High's football stadium was to be dedicated to Al, but Marcy had arranged for it to instead be named after Terry Bradshaw (who says later in the episode he never played football while attending Polk High) out of malice; but after hearing from Kelly how much it would mean to her father if the scoreboard honored him, Bradshaw decides to let the scoreboard to be named after Al. Al did not know this and he arranged to have Jefferson and Bud blow up the scoreboard.

He is a fan of oldies music, and a fan of Westerns. His favorite movie is Hondo (which he missed once in the episode "Assault and Batteries", after having been knocked unconscious when a cash register he threw at an automatic door in frustration bounced off the door and hit him in the head), and his favorite sitcom is the fictional Psycho Dad (he led an unsuccessful protest to have the show put back on the air after it was canceled due to its violent content, leading Al and his NO MA'AM organization members to go to Washington, D.C.). He despises daytime television and often blames Oprah Winfrey for being what he views as a corrupting influence on Peggy and on housewives across the country.

Politically, Al appears to have mixed views with a somewhat conservative outlook (various episodes depict him as mocking Rush Limbaugh, whereas others show him as a huge fan of John Wayne, in particular his movie Hondo). He is an ardent admirer of President Dwight D. Eisenhower, and he often battles his feminist neighbor Marcy, but his views on economic issues appear to be more left-leaning as he has displayed a populist disdain for the wealthy, including leading a violent protest against a proposed law that would tax beer, but not wine.  

Al also has an encyclopedic knowledge of sports trivia, which usually demonstrates how he has little interest in anything else. He does however serve his country by joining the Army National Guard in which Al receives the "Bronze Dumpster" for service during a garbage strike.

Bundy's favorite magazine is Big'uns, though an early episode used an issue of Playboy instead. He enjoys watching sports and adult movies on television, with his right hand tucked into his waistband (he switches to his left hand on Sundays). Though he almost always resists Peggy's frequent amorous advances, he is shown to have a particular fondness for her breasts, which she refers to as "the guys".

Al's talents include bowling (he is an extremely gifted bowler), barbecuing (while wearing an apron that says "Kiss the Cook, Kill the Wife"), and getting into and winning fistfights. He can survive incredible injuries ranging from falling off his roof while installing a satellite dish, getting shocked by that same dish, and being pulverized by a massive woman wrestler (Big Bad Mama from Gorgeous Ladies of Wrestling) in Las Vegas, to jumping from an airplane without a parachute, and surviving a huge explosion when he accidentally detonates dynamite in his own yard trying to kill a rabbit who has been eating his vegetable garden.

Reception 
Al Bundy had a highly positive reception. Much of the praise went to O'Neill's portrayal of the character. Al and Peg were named the 59th best TV characters by Bravo.

In 2009, Time magazine named him among the 10 most memorable fathers in television history. In 2014, BuzzFeed listed Al Bundy as the 10th greatest TV dad of all time.

References

External links 
 Al Bundy Blog – latest Married... with Children news
  Married... with Children news including Al Bundy

Television characters introduced in 1987
American sitcom television characters
Fictional players of American football
Fictional characters from Chicago
Fictional salespeople
Married... with Children
American male characters in television
American culture